Wild at Heart is an ITV television drama series created by Ashley Pharoah about a veterinary surgeon and his family, who emigrate from Bristol, England, to South Africa, where they attempt to rehabilitate a game reserve for wild animals and establish a veterinary surgery and animal hospital. The show ran for seven series beginning on 29 January 2006 and ending on 30 December 2012.

History

Wild at Heart began airing 29 January 2006 on ITV. It ran for seven series, concluding 30 December 2012 with a two-hour finale. It was filmed on location at the Glen Afric Country Lodge, a 1500-acre game reserve and sanctuary that is home to a host of African wildlife, including lions, giraffes, elephants, cheetahs, hippos and buffalo. Glen Afric is located in Broederstroom, North West Province, South Africa. A large set called 'Leopards Den' was built on the property specifically for the production. Producer Ann Harrison-Baxter said: "We literally walked every inch of the reserve to find the best place to build the house, and then it was all created from scratch and aged to look like it had been there for more than a century in just 10 weeks!" Leopards Den was significant as a symbolic character in its own right throughout the show's 7 years. It served as the backdrop against which the family struggled to carve out a new life for themselves, and ultimately to survive and remain together.

The primary cast included Stephen Tompkinson as Danny Trevanion; Amanda Holden as Danny's wife Sarah (died in Series 3); Lucy-Jo Hudson as Danny's daughter Rosie; Deon Stewardson as the Trevanions' business partner Anders DuPlessis ('Dup'); Hayley Mills as Caroline DuPlessis; Luke Ward-Wilkinson as Danny's stepson Evan; Olivia Scott-Taylor as Danny's step-daughter Olivia; Nomsa Xaba as Nomsa – Leopard Den's cook and housekeeper; and Thapelo Mokoena Mara manager, Cedric Fatani, Martinus Van der Berg as town barman and Rosie’s husband, Max; Dawn Steele appeared regularly in Series 4–6 as Alice Collins (later Trevanion), but took maternity leave for all but one episode of Series 7, returning for the Christmas finale. Tarryn Faye Brummage played Alice's daughter Charlotte, and Atandwa Kani appeared in Series 6–7.

Wild at Heart was immensely popular in the UK, with ratings peaking at approximately 10 million viewers and never averaging less than 7.5 million over any series (see below). However, the show faced strong competition during Series 7 and speculation appeared in British online newspaper articles in February 2012 that Wild at Heart would be axed after Series 7. In April 2012, similar statements appeared, but ITV did not publish a formal press release confirming that the show was cancelled.

The two-hour finale special was filmed at Leopards Den in September 2012 and aired on 30 December 2012 on ITV. ITV's Head of Drama Series Steve November said: "Wild at Heart will end on a high thanks to the fantastic cast, crew and writing team who produce the drama. We couldn't wish for a better script to celebrate an immensely successful series for ITV." The finale special was followed on 31 December 2012, by a one-hour documentary titled Wild at Heart: Filming With Animals (see below).

In a BBC Radio 2 interview with Simon Mayo on 24 October 2012, Stephen Tompkinson said, "We got back [from South Africa] about three weeks ago [after filming the finale special]. It was very sad to say 'goodbye'...We are ending it in a way that will let you know it's really the end. We're not sort-of loosely hanging on to go try and get a Christmas Special or a Valentine's Day Special out of it. This is it. It ends with a lovely wedding; I'm not going to say who." (Note: BBC Radio 2 makes their interviews available via iPlayer for only a brief period and this interview is no longer available.)

Wild at Heart aired as a simulcast on TV3 Ireland. The pilot episode was remade for an American audience, with a predominantly American cast, different characters and a loosely similar plot line. It succeeded enough for a first full series to be commissioned with the title Life Is Wild. It aired on The CW Television Network in the U.S., the Hallmark Channel in the United Kingdom, Skai TV in Greece and Warner Channel in South Africa. However, ratings were low and the show was cancelled after Series 1.

The animal action was monitored by the Animal Anti-Cruelty League.

Cast and characters

Ratings 

NOTE: All ratings retrieved from http://www.barb.co.uk and include ITV1 HD and ITV1 +1 for series 6 onwards. (BARB website does not allow capture of page URLs for specific rating sets.)

Series synopsis

Documentary 
A behind-the-scenes documentary titled Wild at Heart – Filming with Animals aired on ITV on 31 December 2012, the evening following the Finale Special. Narrator Stephen Tompkinson, who played the central character, Danny Trevanion, throughout Wild at Heart, introduces the animals and their handlers and gives an insider's view of how some of the show's biggest animal stunts were achieved. It features previously unseen footage and reveals how real-life emergencies are dealt with in the unpredictable world of filming with animals. The documentary was viewed by 3.19 million viewers. Additional behind-the-scenes clips and special features are available on the DVDs.

Soundtrack 

The music for Wild at Heart was composed by Tristin Norwell and Nick Green.  The soundtrack is available from iTunes as a download distributed by AWAL. All profits from its sale are donated to Water Aid.

Offscreen 

On 9 November 2010, cast and crew returned to the Glen Afric reserve to find that Hamley, a very friendly giraffe that had appeared regularly in the series, had been killed by a lightning strike during a thunderstorm. Stephen Tompkinson said, "There was a giraffe called Hamley. He was an amazing creature. I spent hours with him – usually every morning outside my dressing room. He used to come up and put his head by the first-floor window to have his ears and horns scratched. He was struck by lightning...I’d just introduced him to some friends who had come to visit and two hours later I got a call saying he was dead. It was very shocking. It was like losing a human cast member – he was such a part of the show. It just reminds you when your number's up there's nothing you can do about it, so enjoy it while you can."

When asked how Wild at Heart affected the local area in South Africa where it was filmed, Stephen Tompkinson replied: "A few years ago we opened up a community centre in Brazzaville, which is the local township. We also donated money to sort out the water system there and provide more tanks so people didn't have to walk miles to get water every day. It was lovely to be able to give something back....I’m very, very proud of what we all achieved together on Wild at Heart."

DVD release 

Note: All distributed by Acorn Media UK in Region 2 (PAL) format. Only two series have been released in Region 1 format, both are available from Amazon.com.

References

External links 
 
 
 
 

2000s British drama television series
2010s British drama television series
2006 British television series debuts
2012 British television series endings
English-language television shows
ITV television dramas
Television series by All3Media
Television series about animals
Television series about families
Television shows set in South Africa